The George Brine House is a historic house in Winchester, Massachusetts.  Built about 1865, it is a well-preserved example of Second Empire architecture.  It was listed on the National Register of Historic Places in 1989.

Description and history
The George Brine House stands northeast of downtown Winchester, on the east side of Washington Street, a busy north–south through street, between Eaton and Webster Streets.  It is a two-story wood-frame house, with a third floor under its Second Empire mansard roof.  It has a full-width porch with turned balusters and paired pillars, with a projecting central section with decorative brackets.  Above the central doorway are a pair of narrow round-arch windows, and the cornice has dentil moulding and paired brackets.  There is scroll-cut woodwork surrounding the dormer windows, and all of the main windows have bracketed sills.  Two two-story ells extend the building to the rear, and there is a period carriage barn with cupola at the back of the property.

The house was built sometime between 1854 and 1870 (estimated 1865 based on style) by Joseph Shattuck, a local builder.  He apparently used it as a rental property until selling it to George Brine in 1893.  The house typifies development made in the mid-19th century to attract new residents to what was then seen as a fashionable residential area.

See also
National Register of Historic Places listings in Winchester, Massachusetts

References

Houses on the National Register of Historic Places in Winchester, Massachusetts
Houses in Winchester, Massachusetts